Fortunata is an Italian girl's name. Fortunata is celebrated on October 14 in memory of Santa Fortunata, a 4th-century Christian martyr in Caesarea. The Roman Catholic Church recognizes nineteen Saints and Saints bearing the name Fortunato and Fortunata.

People
Saint Fortunata, martyr at Rome (14 February) 
Saint Fortunata, martyr venerated at Patria (14 October)
 Maria Fortunata d'Este (1731–1803), Modenese princess by birth and a princess of the blood of France by marriage
 Blessed Maria Fortunata Viti (1827–1922), Italian Benedictine nun (20 November)

Fictional characters
Fortunata, name of the titular seagull in the animated film La gabbianella e il gatto 1998
 Fortunata, lead character in Fortunata, a 2017 film
 Fortunata, the wife of Trimalchio in the Satyricon of Petronius, 1st century AD
 Fortunata, in the novel Fortunata y Jacinta by Benito Pérez Galdós 1887
 Fortunata, an anthropomorphic fox in the book Mossflower in the Redwall series 
 Fortunata, in the novel The Heretic's Apprentice by Ellis Peters 1989

References

Italian feminine given names